Saprosecans baloghi is a species of mite in the family Halolaelapidae. It is found in Europe.

References

Mesostigmata
Articles created by Qbugbot
Animals described in 1964